Kookmin University is the first private university founded after the liberation of the Republic of Korea from Japan. The campus is located in Seongbuk-gu, Seoul, South Korea. The KMU was established in 1946. Gu kim, Soang Jo and Ikhee Shin, who were the cabinet members of the Provisional Government of the Republic of Korea, agreed to train great leaders for the Republic of Korea. Soon, they became the banner of Kookmin University. Ikhee Shin contributed to play a key role in its foundation and was inaugurated as the First President of the University.

In 1959, the SsangYong Group bought the university to support researches and to expand the university curriculum. 22,000 colleagues are studying at the university, and 350 administrative staff are working at the university's 800 faculties. Since its establishment in 1946, approximately 60,000 students have graduated.

The KMU consists of 14 undergraduate colleges, several postgraduate schools and 10 professional-technitique schools. As a research university, it offers degrees, scholarships and conferences from Baccalaureate (Bachelor's degree) to doctorate level. The international rank and reputation are going up.

The Korean Institute of Design Promotion (KIDP) has granted the right of Design Amalgamation Specialised Postgraduate School to the Graduate School of Techno Design for two years. The TeD has been supported by research funds in order to develop the user interface and experience designs.

History
Kookmin University was established by the Korean government-in-exile based in Shanghai during the Japanese occupation of Korea. Ikhee "Haikong" Shin became the first president of the university. He went on to serve the country as the first House Speaker of the National Assembly.

In 1959, Sunggon "Sungkok" Kim, the founder of the SsangYong Group, took over the university foundation and has continuously supported academic and research activities.

Academics

Kookmin University's academic programs are organized into undergraduate colleges, graduate schools, professional, and special schools. It is the first school that created the Department of Automotive Engineering among four-year universities in Korea.

Undergraduate Colleges

Graduate school
The Kookmin University Graduate School consists of departments within five main areas of study: Humanities & Social Studies, Natural Science, Engineering, Arts & Physical Education and Interdisciplinary Programs.

Campus

Academic & Administrative Buildings
Administration Hall
Bugak Hall
College of Engineering
College of Law
College of Design
College of Science
Hyungsul Hall
International Hall
College of Business Administration
College of Economics and Commerce
College of Art
Building 7
Student Union
Graduate School of Techno Design
Innovation and Partnership Building
Global Center
Guest House
On-Campus Dormitories
R.O.T.C.
Lifelong Education Practical Building
Gymnasium
Sungkok Library
Sungkok library was founded at the opening of Kookmin University in December 1946. It moved to its current location in the Jeongneung-dong building in 1971. A new space was built with the support of the SsangYong Group, and was named after its founder Kim Sunggon, also known as Sungkok. 
The library has a database and 7 million books, multimedia data, 2000 kinds of internal and external scholarly journals, 50000 kinds of foreign journals (21 DBs), 1300 online journals, 52000 e-Books, and 2700 seats in cubicles.

Myungwon Folk House
Myungwon house is affiliated with Kookmin University and has been designated as Seoul National Treasure No.7. The house was the residence of Han Kyu-seol, who was the Mayor of Seoul and the Minister of Political Affairs during the late Joseon dynasty. In 1980, on the verge of demolition due to the urban redevelopment of central Seoul, it was donated by the family of the former owner, the late Joon Hyuk Park and his eldest son Hyo Jong Henry Park to the late Kim Myoungwon, Mee Hee, and then reconstructed at the present site adjacent to Kookmin University.

Affiliated Research institutes

Notable people

Alumni

Korean Language Center
Korean Language Education was started to help foreign students learn Korean Language and culture. About 1,800 students from more than 15 countries are currently studying at the Korean Language Center.

Gallery

References

 
1946 establishments in Korea
Educational institutions established in 1946
Private universities and colleges in South Korea
Seongbuk District